Dennis Kelly Seyarto (born 1962) is an American politician who served as a member of the California State Assembly from the 67th district. Seyarto is a former mayor of Murrieta, California.

Early life and education 
On January 21, 1962, Seyarto was born in La Puente, California. Seyarto grew up in Baldwin Park, California and La Verne, California. In 1981, Seyarto earned an associate degree in fire science from Mt. San Antonio College. In 1989, Seyarto earned a Bachelor of Science degree in fire protection administration and technology from California State University, Los Angeles. In 1996, Seyarto earned a Master of Public Administration degree from California State University, Long Beach.

Career 
In 1981, Seyarto began his career as a paid reserve firefighter in the La Verne Fire Department. In 1983, Seyarto joined the Inglewood Fire Department, which was incorporated into the Los Angeles County Fire Department in 2000. In 2015, after 35 years, Seyarto retired with the rank of battalion chief from Los Angeles County Fire Department.

In 1997, Seyarto was elected to the Murrieta City Council. He served until 2006 and again starting in 2016. During his tenure, Seyarto was selected to serve as the mayor of Murrieta in 2000, 2003, 2006, and 2019.

In the 2020 nonpartisan blanket primary for California's 67th State Assembly district, Seyarto placed second in a field of five candidates. On November 3, 2020, Seyarto won the election and became a Republican member of the California State Assembly for District 67. Seyarto defeated lawyer Jerry Carlos with 60.02% of the votes. Syarto's term began on December 7, 2020.

On January 3, 2022, Seyarto announced that he would be a candidate for the California State Senate to succeed incumbent Melissa Melendez, who is ineligible to seek reelection due to term limits.

Awards 
 2020 Outstanding Public Service Award. Presented by Riverside Division of the League of California Cities.

Personal life 
Seyarto and his wife, Denise Seyarto, have three daughters. Seyarto and his family live in Murrieta, California.

2020 California State Assembly

References

External links
 Kelly Seyarto at nfib.com
 Kelly Seyaryo at ballotpedia.org
 Join California Kelly Seyarto

1962 births
Living people
People from La Verne, California
People from Murrieta, California
American firefighters
Mt. San Antonio College alumni
California State University, Los Angeles alumni
California State University, Long Beach alumni
California city council members
Mayors of places in California
Republican Party members of the California State Assembly
21st-century American politicians